Andorra, represented by the Andorran Olympic Committee, sent a team to compete at the 2008 Summer Olympics in Beijing, China.

Athletics

Men

Women

Canoeing

Slalom

Judo

Swimming

Men

References

Nations at the 2008 Summer Olympics
2008 Summer Olympics
2008 in Andorran sport